The Croatia national sitting volleyball team represents Croatia in international  sitting volleyball competitions and friendly matches. It is controlled by the Croatian Sitting Volleyball Federation.

Sitting volleyball

Competitive record

Paralympic Games

World Championship

European Championship

Standing para volleyball

Competitive record

Paralympic Games

World Championship

European Championship

References 
http://www.worldparavolley.org/world-paravolley-sitting-volleyball-world-championships-history/
https://www.hpo.hr/novosti/Predstavljamo-Saveze-8211-Hrvatski-savez-sjedece-odbojke/674

External links
Official website

National sitting volleyball teams
Volleyball in Croatia
Para-Volleyball